Kinohaku was a Maori woman of Ngāti Maniapoto in the Tainui tribal confederation from the Waikato region, New Zealand. She is the eponymous ancestor of the Ngāti Kinohaku hapu (sub-tribe) of Ngāti Maniapoto and probably lived in the seventeenth century.

Life
Kinohaku was a daughter of Rereahu, through whom she was a direct male-line descendant of Hoturoa, the captain of the Tainui canoe, and his second wife Hine-au-pounamu, also a descendant of Hoturoa. She had one older half-brother, Te Ihinga-a-rangi, six full brothers, Maniapoto, Matakore, Tū-whakahekeao, Tūrongo-tapu-ārau, Te Io-wānanga / Te Āio-wānanga, and Kahu-ariari, and one full sister Te Rongorito.

Kinohaku and her full siblings were raised in region around Kāwhia. Subsequently, they settled along the Waipā River and the Manga-o-kewa Stream, with a central hub at Te Kūiti.

Marriage to Tū-irirangi

Kinohaku married Tū-irirangi, who was her cousin on both sides, since his father, Huiao son of Whāita, was a great-grandson of Rereahu’s brother Kurawari, while his mother Māpau-inuhia was the sister of Hine-au-Pounamu’s father Tū-a-tangiroa. The amount of food gathered by Tū-irirangi and his tribe for the wedding feast was enormous and remains a source of mana for the descendants of the marriage, Ngāti Kinohaku. In response to this, some Tainui people joked that Kinohaku had been “bought with pipi.”

After the marriage Tū-irirangi and Kinohaku settled at Ngaku-raho, a rocky pinnacle near Hangatiki and very near the final base of Kinohaku’s brother Maniapoto at Te Ana-a-Maniapoto / Te Ana-a-uriuri. They had three sons and one daughter together. 
 Whakapau-tangaroa
 Kāhui-tangaroa
 Tangaroa-kino
 Rangipare, who was meant to marry Wairangi, but eloped with her cousin Tū-taka-moana, son of Maniapoto, with whom she had one son, Rangatahi, an ancestor of the Ngāti Urunumia hapu of Ngāti Maniapoto.

After many years, Hinerangi visited Ngaku-raho, while she was fleeing the murder of her father, Mania-takamaiwaho. Tū-irirangi developed a desire to marry her, but she refused. However, Kinohaku was furious that her husband had planned to marry another woman, so she had an affair with Tū-irirangi’s half-brother Pai-ariki. When Tū-irirangi found out, he went to Pai-ariki’s village, Te Rua-o-te-manu near Te Kuiti, intending to murder him, but was unable to do the deed. Afterwards, he went away to Kāwhia, where he re-married and had another son.

Sources 
Pei Te Hurinui Jones and Leslie Kelly give accounts of Kinohaku’s life, based on oral traditions that they heard from Whare Hotu of Oparure (an 8th generation descendant of Kinohaku).

Ngāti Kinohaku

The Ngāti Kinohaku hapu of Ngāti Maniapoto are descendants of Kinohaku. They have the following marae (in alphabetical order), most of which they share with various other hapu of Ngāti Maniapoto:
 Te Kauae marae and Te Kauae o Niu Tereni wharenui, in Hangatiki, shared with Ngāti Huiao, Ngāti Peehi, and Ngāti Te Kanawa
 Marokopa marae and Miromiro i te Pō wharenui, in Marokopa, shared with Ngāti Peehi, and Ngāti Te Kanawa
 Mōkau Kohunui marae and Ko Tama Tāne wharenui, in Piopio, shared with Ngāti Apakura and Ngāti Waiora
 Mōtītī marae and Ko te Hungaiti / Hapainga wharenui, in Te Kuiti, shared with Ngāti Putaitemuri and Ngāti Tauhunu
 Te Waipatoto marae and Waipatoto and Waipatoto Tuarua wharenui, in Oparure

References

Bibliography

External links
Home page of Motiti marae, Ngāti Kinohaku.

17th-century New Zealand people
New Zealand Māori women
People from Waikato
Ngāti Maniapoto people